Peter Werth is a British fashion designer. In 1975 he started his eponymously titled fashion brand in Islington, London.

Werth studied at the Walthamstow School of Art.

References

External links
 
 Peter Werth Online Store

British fashion designers
Living people
Year of birth missing (living people)